Robin Sue Kohn  (born January 4, 1962) is a former child actress noted for providing the voice of Lucy van Pelt in various Peanuts animation films during the early 1970s in Snoopy Come Home; You're Not Elected, Charlie Brown; A Charlie Brown Thanksgiving; and There's No Time for Love, Charlie Brown. Later on, her sister Melanie Kohn would inherit the role from her. She is now a real estate broker in Marin County, California and does some voiceover and acting work under the name Robin Kohn Glazer.

Filmography

External links
 
 Glazer's website

American child actresses
American child singers
1962 births
Living people
21st-century American women